VUU may refer to:

Victoria University Uganda, in Kampala, Uganda
Virginia Union University, in Richmond, Virginia, United States